USS LST-970 was an  in the United States Navy. Like many of her class, she was not named and is properly referred to by her hull designation.

Construction
LST-970 was laid down on 14 November 1944, at Hingham, Massachusetts, by the Bethlehem-Hingham Shipyard; launched on 16 December 1944; sponsored by Major Anne B. Cowan, WAC; and commissioned on 13 January 1945.

Service history
During World War II, LST-970 was assigned to the Asiatic-Pacific theater and participated the assault and occupation of Okinawa Gunto in May and June 1945.

Following the war, she performed occupation duty in the Far East and saw service in China until late February. She returned to the United States and was decommissioned on 10 July 1946, and struck from the Navy list on 15 August, that same year. On 25 April 1947, the ship was sold to Trailerships, Inc., for operation.

Awards
LST-970 earned one battle star for World War II service.

Notable crew
Character actor Harry Dean Stanton, famous for roles in films like Alien and Twin Peaks: Fire Walk With Me, was assigned to the 970 for the whole of his wartime service.

Notes

Citations

Bibliography 

Online resources

External links
 

 

LST-542-class tank landing ships
World War II amphibious warfare vessels of the United States
Ships built in Hingham, Massachusetts
1944 ships